Chloraea  is a genus of air-breathing land snails, terrestrial pulmonate gastropod mollusks in the subfamily Helicostylinae of the family Camaenidae.

Species 
Species in the genus Chloraea  include:

 Chloraea aegrota (Reeve, 1851)
 Chloraea aeruginosa (L. Pfeiffer, 1855)
 Chloraea almae Möllendorff, 1890
 Chloraea amoena (L. Pfeiffer, 1845)
 Chloraea antonii C. Semper, 1880
 Chloraea benguetensis C. Semper, 1880
 Chloraea bifasciata (I. Lea, 1841)
 Chloraea caerulea (Möllendorff, 1888)
 Chloraea casta (L. Pfeiffer, 1849)
 Chloraea cristatella Quadras & Möllendorff, 1893
 Chloraea curvilabra (A. Adams & Reeve, 1850)
 Chloraea cymodoce (Crosse, 1869)
 Chloraea dealbata (Broderip, 1841)
 Chloraea difficilis (L. Pfeiffer, 1854)
 Chloraea dryope (Broderip, 1841)
 Chloraea elizabethae (O. Semper, 1866)
 Chloraea extensa (Müller, 1774)
 Chloraea eydouxi (Hidalgo, 1887)
 Chloraea fibula (Reeve, 1842)
 Chloraea filaris (L. Pfeiffer, 1845)
 Chloraea geotrochus Möllendorff, 1888
 Chloraea globosula (Möllendorff, 1894)
 Chloraea gmeliniana (L. Pfeiffer, 1845)
 Chloraea hanleyi (L. Pfeiffer, 1845)
 Chloraea hennigiana Möllendorff, 1893
 Chloraea intaminata (Gould, 1852)
 Chloraea intorta (G. B. Sowerby I, 1841)
 Chloraea irosinensis (Hidalgo, 1887)
 Chloraea lais (L. Pfeiffer, 1854)
 Chloraea limansauensis (C. Semper, 1877)
 Chloraea loheri (Möllendorff, 1894)
 Chloraea magtanensis (C. Semper, 1877)
 Chloraea malleata Quadras & Möllendorff, 1893
 Chloraea papyracea (Broderip, 1841)
 Chloraea paradoxa (L. Pfeiffer, 1845)
 Chloraea patricia (L. Pfeiffer, 1859)
 Chloraea pelewana (Mousson, 1869)
 Chloraea physalis (L. Pfeiffer, 1871)
 Chloraea psittacina (Deshayes, 1861)
 Chloraea puella (Broderip, 1841)
 Chloraea quadrasi Möllendorff, 1896
 Chloraea reginae (Broderip, 1841)
 Chloraea restricta (L. Pfeiffer, 1854)
 Chloraea samboanga (Hombron & Jacquinot, 1847)
 Chloraea sirena (L. Pfeiffer, 1842)
 Chloraea smaragdina (Grateloup, 1840)
 Chloraea sphaerion (G. B. Sowerby I, 1841)
 Chloraea subpuella (Pilsbry, 1891)
 Chloraea subtenuis (E. A. Smith, 1896)
 Chloraea tangoelandangensis (Rolle, 1910)
 Chloraea thersites (Broderip, 1841)
 Chloraea undina (L. Pfeiffer, 1856)
 Chloraea unifasciata Möllendorff, 1898
 Chloraea virgo (Broderip, 1841)

References 

 Crosse, H., 1869. Diagnoses molluscorum novorum. Journal de Conchyliologie 17: 183-188
 Bank, R. A. (2017). Classification of the Recent terrestrial Gastropoda of the World. Last update: July 16, 2017

External links

 Albers, J. C. (1850). Die Heliceen nach natürlicher Verwandtschaft systematisch geordnet. Berlin: Enslin. 262

Camaenidae
Gastropod genera